Makinouchi Dam  is a gravity dam located in Hokkaido Prefecture in Japan. The dam is used for water supply. The catchment area of the dam is 5 km2. The dam impounds about 18  ha of land when full and can store 696 thousand cubic meters of water. The construction of the dam was started on 1978 and completed in 1980.

References

Dams in Hokkaido